Peter McGuire (born 24 October 1982) is a Scottish Boccia player.

Personal life
McGuire was born in Bellshill, North Lanarkshire, Scotland. He was born with muscular dystrophy, a degenerative condition that means he requires the use of a wheelchair.

Boccia
McGuire was introduced to the sport of boccia by his brother Stephen, who also has muscular dystrophy. He competes in the BC4 classification.

In 2008, he was named both Scottish and British champion. In 2009 he won the gold medal in the BC4 pairs event at the European Championships held in Porto, Portugal. In 2010, competing with his brother Stephen, he won the silver medal at the World Championships in Lisbon, Portugal.

In 2012, Peter and Stephen were selected as part of the boccia squad for Great Britain at the 2012 Summer Paralympics.

Peter competed for Scotland in the 2017 Scottish International Boccia Open on 1314 October 2017 at the Inverclyde National Sports Training Centre. In the BC4 Pairs event, along with his 17-year-old stablemate Ross Munro, he took Gold against the Boccia UK BC4 Pairs team of Evie Edwards and Louis Saunders. In a three-match series, the pair won all three matches by the scores of 42 (Game 1), 31 (Game 2), and 42 (Game 3).

Coaching
McGuire is now a UKCC Level 2 Boccia Coach and passing on his wealth of experience to new up and coming boccia players in Scotland. He coaches at a number of clubs in Glasgow and Lanarkshire and is also head referee and coach for the Glasgow Gladiators Boccia Club.

References

Living people
1982 births
Boccia players at the 2012 Summer Paralympics
Paralympic boccia players of Great Britain